A speaker grille (or speaker grill) is usually found in front of many consumer and industrial loudspeakers, and consists of either a hard or soft screen/grille mounted directly over the face of the speaker driver.  Its main purpose is to protect the driver element and speaker internals (and possibly other audio components) from foreign objects while still allowing the sound to clearly pass.  However, because it sits in the direct path of the driver, the grille interacts with the sound produced. A suitable compromise between protection and sound quality must be made based on the speaker's application.

Types

Soft Grilles
Soft grilles can be made from any well suited cloth, weaving, stitching, foam, fabric upholsteries and other similar materials.  In general, soft grilles impose little resistance on the speaker driver because the material is free to move synchronously with the sound waves.  Because the grille is capable of absorbing this vibration, softer grilles are (in general) less prone to rattling except at extremely high sound pressure levels.

Soft grilles offer protection from small, lightweight objects, and may be water resistant to some degree but could be susceptible to being torn, or even stretched enough to reach the driver.

Hard Grilles
Hard grilles can be made from many types of construction material including metal, wood or plastic.  Some solid grilles are made from a board or sheet of material with holes drilled or cut for the sound to pass, while others are made with thin strips of material either crosshatched together or equally spaced in parallel.

Because hard material is not free to move with the speaker's sound like soft material, the speaker's output level must be considered when designing the grille.  A grille with more holes will allow more sound to pass but will offer less protection from small objects.  A speaker with too much material in front of the driver will begin to distort at higher sound pressure levels, and in severe instances could damage the speaker, resulting in unwanted rattling at the least.

Impracticalities
Some types of speakers have such eccentric characteristics that a grille would interact too much with the sound to be practical.  Studio monitors, for instance, are required to reproduce audio so accurately that anything in the path of the speaker could obscure aspects of the sound, and thus are rarely seen with grilles.  

On the other hand, high powered subwoofers (such as those used in high-end car audio applications), produce such violent sound waves that a grille may be susceptible to rattling or damage while the driver is under load.  All but the most sparse grilles also possess the possibility of diminishing or distorting the low frequency waves being produced.

Some speakers simply don't need a grille, perhaps because they are enclosed in a case (such as speakers found inside personal computers) and are not meant to produce high fidelity audio, but only audible tones and noises.

See also
 Loudspeaker
 Loudspeaker enclosure

References

Loudspeakers